The 1885 Chicago White Stockings season was the 14th season of the Chicago White Stockings franchise, the 10th in the National League and the 1st at the first West Side Park. The White Stockings won the National League pennant for the first time since 1882, beating the New York Giants by two games. They went on to face the St. Louis Browns in the 1885 World Series. The series ended without a champion, with both teams winning three games with one tie.

Regular season

Season standings

Record vs. opponents

Roster

Player stats

Batting

Starters by position
Note: Pos = Position; G = Games played; AB = At bats; H = Hits; Avg. = Batting average; HR = Home runs; RBI = Runs batted in

Other batters
Note: G = Games played; AB = At bats; H = Hits; Avg. = Batting average; HR = Home runs; RBI = Runs batted in

Pitching

Starting pitchers
Note: G = Games pitched; IP = Innings pitched; W = Wins; L = Losses; ERA = Earned run average; SO = Strikeouts

Other pitchers
Note: G = Games pitched; IP = Innings pitched; W = Wins; L = Losses; ERA = Earned run average; SO = Strikeouts

Relief pitchers
Note: G = Games pitched; W = Wins; L = Losses; SV = Saves; ERA = Earned run average; SO = Strikeouts

1885 World Series

The White Stockings tied the St. Louis Browns in the World Series 3–3–1.

 Game 1 (October 14): Darkness ends game one after 8 innings‚ with the teams tied 5–5.
 Game 2 (October 15): With Chicago leading 5–4 in the sixth inning, Browns manager Charles Comiskey calls his team off the field to protest a ruling made by umpire Dave Sullivan. The game is forfeited to Chicago.
 Game 6 (October 23): The series moves from Pittsburgh to Cincinnati‚ setting a record for the series played in the most cities. (It was also played in New York and St. Louis.) Chicago takes a 3–2 series lead by beating the Browns 9–2.
 Game 7 (October 24): Behind pitcher Dave Foutz, St. Louis defeats Chicago 13–4 in the 7th and last game. The Browns claim the game 2 forfeit didn't count and therefore claim the championship. The two clubs split the $1000 prize.

Notes

References
1885 Chicago White Stockings season at Baseball Reference

Chicago Cubs seasons
Chicago White Stockings season
National League champion seasons
World Series champion seasons
Chicago Cubs